Bactra lacteana is a moth belonging to the family Tortricidae first described by Aristide Caradja in 1916.

It is native to Europe.

References

Bactrini